Back in the USSR is a 1992 American thriller film directed by Deran Sarafian and starring Frank Whaley, Natalya Negoda and Roman Polanski. Written and produced by Ilmar Taska and Lindsay Smith.

Plot
Set in Moscow during the last years of the Soviet Union, with Gorbachev's glasnost and perestroika in full swing, the film follows Archer Sloan, a young American student from Chicago, who arrives hoping to sample the delights of Moscow, but runs into a number of people interested in stolen art works.

Cast
 Frank Whaley as Archer Sloan
 Natalya Negoda as Lena
 Roman Polanski as Kurilov
 Andrew Divoff as Dimitro
 Dey Young as Claudia
 Ravil Isyanov as Georgi
 Harry Ditson as Whittier
 Brian Blessed as Chazov
 Constantine Gregory as Stanley
Boris Romanov as father Pyotr
Vsevolod Safonov as Ivan
Yuri Sarantsev as concierge
Oleg Anofriyev as taxi driver

References

1992 films
1992 crime thriller films
Films set in Moscow
Cold War films
Films set in the Soviet Union
Films directed by Deran Sarafian
American crime thriller films
1990s English-language films
1990s American films